Bang Khae station is a Bangkok MRT rapid transit station on the Blue Line, located above Phet Kasem Road located in Bangkok, Thailand.

The station located in the area of Bang Khae Market, one of largest and oldest wet market in Thonburi side and Bangkok.

References 

 This article incorporates material from the corresponding article in the Thai Wikipedia as of 21 September 2019.

MRT (Bangkok) stations
2019 establishments in Thailand
Railway stations opened in 2019